William Carruthers may refer to:
 William Carruthers (botanist) (1830–1922), Scottish botanist
 Will Carruthers (born 1967), musician

See also
 William Alexander Caruthers (1802–1846), American novelist